Robert Standish Sievier (1860–1939) was a British racehorse trainer and owner. He was Champion Trainer in 1902. He was principally known for his training of the filly Sceptre, who he also owned during the 1902 season in which she became the only horse to win four English Classic Races outright.

References

External links
 

British racehorse trainers
1860 births
1939 deaths
British racehorse owners and breeders